Sphenopholis is a genus of North American and Hawaiian plants in the grass family.

They are known generally as wedgescales.

 Species
 Sphenopholis filiformis - longleaf wedgescale - TX OK AR LA TN MS AL GA FL NC SC VA PA
 Sphenopholis intermedia - slender wedgescale - Canada (every province + territory except Nunavut), USA (every state except California + Hawaii)
 Sphenopholis interrupta - CO OK AZ NM TX LA, Baja California
 Sphenopholis longiflora - Texas wedgescale - TX OK AR LA
 Sphenopholis nitida - shiny wedgescale - Ontario, eastern half of United States
 Sphenopholis obtusata - prairie wedgescale - widespread in contiguous United States + southern Canada, plus Hawaii, Mexico + Hispaniola
 Sphenopholis × pallens - scattered locations in eastern half of USA—hybrid S. obtusata × S. pensylvanica
 Sphenopholis pensylvanica - swamp wedgescale - eastern half of USA

References

Pooideae
Poaceae genera